The Real Estate General Authority is a Saudi government agency was established in 2017 to regulate rules, stimulate investment and provide consumer protection in the real estate industry in Saudi Arabia. The authority is also in charge of enhancing market transparency through publishing real estate market indicators.

Structure 
The authority is headquartered in Riyadh, the Saudi capital city and it is financially and administratively independent. The authority is administrated by a board of directors chaired by the Minister of Housing.

References 

Government agencies of Saudi Arabia
2017 establishments in Saudi Arabia